The men's 200 metres event at the 1995 Summer Universiade was held on 29–30 August at the Hakatanomori Athletic Stadium in Fukuoka, Japan.

Medalists

Results

Heats
Qualification: First 3 of each heat (Q) and the next 7 fastest (q) qualified for the quarterfinals.

Wind:Heat 1: -1.0 m/s, Heat 2: -0.5 m/s, Heat 3: -0.4 m/s, Heat 4: +0.6 m/s, Heat 5: -0.9 m/s, Heat 6: -0.7 m/sHeat 7: +0.3 m/s, Heat 8: +0.2 m/s, Heat 9: -0.1 m/s, Heat 10: -0.7 m/s, Heat 11: -1.0 m/s

Quarterfinals
Qualification: First 3 of each heat (Q) and the next 1 fastest (q) qualified for the semifinals.

Wind:Heat 1: -0.4 m/s, Heat 2: -1.1 m/s, Heat 3: +0.2 m/s, Heat 4: +0.3 m/s, Heat 5: +0.2 m/s

Semifinals
Qualification: First 4 of each semifinal qualified directly (Q) for the final.

Wind:Heat 1: +0.4 m/s, Heat 2: +1.5 m/s

Final
Wind: +0.6 m/s

References

Athletics at the 1995 Summer Universiade
1995